Jimmy Connors was the defending champion but did not compete that year.

Vitas Gerulaitis won in the final 4–6, 6–3, 6–1, 7–6 against Guillermo Vilas.

Seeds

  Vitas Gerulaitis (champion)
  Guillermo Vilas (final)
  Pat Du Pré (first round)
 n/a
  Vijay Amritraj (second round)
  Peter Feigl (quarterfinals)
  Geoff Masters (second round)
  Tom Gorman (second round)

Draw

Section 1

Section 2

External links
 1979 Custom Credit Australian Indoor Championships draw

Singles